La Bohème (also known as La bohème de Puccini) is a 1988 Italian-French film of an opera directed by Luigi Comencini. It is based on  Giacomo Puccini's 1896 opera La bohème.

Cast 
Barbara Hendricks as Mimì
Luca Canonici as Rodolfo (dubbed by José Carreras)
Angela Maria Blasi as Musetta
Gino Quilico as Marcello
Francesco Ellero D'Artegna as Colline
Richard Cowan as Schaunard
Ciccio Ingrassia as Parpignol (dubbed by Michel Sénéchal)
Massimo Girotti as Alcindoro
Mario Maranzana

References

External links

1980s musical films
Italian musical films
Films directed by Luigi Comencini
Films based on La bohème
Films based on works by Giuseppe Giacosa
Films set in Paris
Films set in the 19th century
French musical films
Opera films
1980s Italian-language films
1980s French films
1980s Italian films